Escuela de Fútbol Concepción is a football team based in Madrid in the autonomous community of Community of Madrid. It plays in the Preferente de Aficionados. Its stadium is Polideportivo Municipal with a capacity of 1,000 seats.

Season to season

{|
|valign="top" width=49%|

|valign="top" width=0%|

0 seasons in Tercera División

Former players
 Alberto Bueno
Mario Hermoso

External links
Official website
Profile

Football clubs in Madrid
Association football clubs established in 1976
Divisiones Regionales de Fútbol clubs
1976 establishments in Spain